Jamshid Iskanderov (Uzbek Cyrillic: Жамшид Искандеров; born 16 October 1993) is an Uzbekistani footballer who plays for Navbahor Namangan and Uzbekistan national football team. He played at the 2013 FIFA U-20 World Cup, 2015 AFC Asian Cup qualification.

Club career

Pakhtakor
Iskanderov made his debut in Uzbek League on 28 May 2011 as FK Samarqand-Dinamo player in an away match against Qizilqum Zarafshon, coming in as a substitute in the 57th minute. Since 2011 he has played for Pakhtakor. In 2014, he was named twice, in May and October, as Player of the Month in Uzbek League.

On 6 March 2015 he won the "2014 Player of the Year in Uzbek League" award.

International career
He made his debut for Uzbekistan on 6 September 2013 in the 2014 FIFA World Cup qualification match against Jordan. In 2015 AFC Asian Cup in Australia he played in 3 matches.

International goals
Scores and results list Uzbekistan's goal tally first.

Honours

Club
Pakhtakor
 Uzbekistan Super League (2): 2012, 2014, 2015
 Uzbekistan Cup (1): 2011

Individual
 Uzbekistan Footballer of the Year 2022
 Uzbekistan Super League Player of the Year: 2014

References

External links
 
 

1993 births
Living people
Uzbekistani footballers
Uzbekistani expatriate footballers
Uzbekistan international footballers
Pakhtakor Tashkent FK players
PFC Lokomotiv Tashkent players
Seongnam FC players
Uzbekistan Super League players
K League 1 players
Sportspeople from Tashkent
Association football defenders
2015 AFC Asian Cup players
Footballers at the 2014 Asian Games
Asian Games competitors for Uzbekistan
Uzbekistani expatriate sportspeople in South Korea
Expatriate footballers in South Korea